Benedetto Luperti (1629 – 23 September 1709) was a Roman Catholic prelate who served as Bishop of Cagli (1694–1709).

Biography
Benedetto Luperti was born in Cagli, Italy in 1629.
On 19 April 1694, he was appointed during the papacy of Pope Innocent XII as Bishop of Cagli.
On 25 April 1694, he was consecrated bishop by Michelangelo Mattei, Titular Patriarch of Antioch, with Giuseppe Felice Barlacci, Bishop Emeritus of Narni, and Carlo Giuseppe Morozzo, Bishop of Bobbio, serving as co-consecrators. 
He served as Bishop of Cagli until his death on 23 September 1709.

References

External links and additional sources

17th-century Italian Roman Catholic bishops
18th-century Italian Roman Catholic bishops
Bishops appointed by Pope Innocent XII
1629 births
1694 deaths